The Isle of Thanet is a peninsula forming the easternmost part of Kent, England. While in the past it was separated from the mainland by the  Wantsum Channel, it is no longer an island.

Archaeological remains testify to its settlement in ancient times. Today, it is a tourist destination, and has an active agricultural base.

Etymology
The island of Thanet is mentioned as Tonetic (c. AD 150; the TON- of this form was misread as TOΛI-, hence it appears as Toliatis in the surviving manuscripts of Ptolemy); Tanat's (3rd C AD, Solinus); Tanatos (AD 731); Tenid in 679 and Tenet (e.g. charters of AD 679, 689 and thereafter); and the Old Welsh forms Tanet and Danet, found in the Historia Brittonum (c. AD 829/30) and Armes Prydein (c. AD 930).

Standard reference works for English place-names (such as Eilert Ekwall's Concise Oxford Dictionary of English Place-Names) state the name Tanet is known to be Brythonic in origin. Commonly the original meaning of Thanet is thought to be "fire" or "bright island" (tân in Modern Welsh and tan in Breton means fire), and this has led to speculation the island was home to an ancient beacon or lighthouse.

Another theory states that Tanet is a common European toponymic creation of Celtic origin, based on the Celtic word *tanno- meaning "holm oak" (compare Breton tann "sort of oak", Cornish glastannen "holm oak") and the Celtic suffix *-etu, to mean a collection of trees. Thanet would mean "place of the holm oaks", such as the Northern French Thenney (Eure, Thaneth ab. 1050); Tennie (Sarthe, Tanida 9th century) or the Italian Tanedo (Lombardy, Tanetum, Tite-Live).

The 7th-century Archbishop Isidore of Seville recorded an apocryphal folk-etymology in which the island's name is fancifully connected with the Greek word for death (Thanatos/Θάνατος), stating that Thanet, "an island of the ocean separated from Britain by a narrow channel ... [was] called Tanatos from the death of serpents; for while it has none of its own, soil taken from it to any place whatsoever kills snakes there."

The Historia Brittonum, written in the 9th century, states that "Tanet" was the name used for the island by the legendary Jutes Hengist and Horsa, while its name in Old Welsh was "Ruoi(c)hin"; this name may be translated as "gift" (rhwych in Modern Welsh).

History

Archaeological evidence shows that the area now known as the Isle of Thanet was one of the major areas of Stone Age settlement. A large hoard of Bronze Age implements has been found at Minster-in-Thanet; and several Iron Age settlements have also come to light.

Julius Caesar made two attempts to invade Britain, in both 55 and 54 BC. They further linked it to Caesar's invasion of Britain in 54 BC, and suggested that the invading force arrived in nearby Pegwell Bay. Nearly a century later, in 43 AD, Claudius sent four legions to Britain, where the Romans were to remain for the next 400 years. During that time the port of Richborough, on the opposite side of the Wantsum Channel,  became one of the chief ports of Roman Britain.

According to the eighth-century ecclesiastical historian Bede, Vortigern, King of the Britons, was under attack from other tribes and called for assistance. Among those who came were the Jutes Hengist and Horsa; Vortigern is said to have rewarded them with the Isle of Thanet in return for their services. As the following extract from the Historia Brittonum (first written sometime shortly after 833) testifies:

This story, however, is an example of non-historical founding myths,  though one constructed with political objectives in mind. In reality, it appears to have been settled by Jutes under Visigothic authority between 476-517 AD,though they may have been present earlier as Foederati. These were followed by Ingaevones in the sixth century.

Throughout this time the Isle remained an island. The Wantsum Channel allowed ships to sail between the mainland and the island in calm waters. Gradually this silted up, and the last ship sailed through the Channel in 1672.

In 597 Augustine of Canterbury is said, by Bede, to have landed with 40 men at Ebbsfleet, in the parish of Minster-in-Thanet, before founding Britain's second Christian monastery in Canterbury (the first was founded fifty years earlier by Columba on Eileach an Naoimh in the Hebrides): a cross marks the spot.

Following the raids on the Isle of Sheppey, Thanet became a regular target for Viking attacks, its vulnerable coastal monasteries providing convenient targets for the invaders. By 851 and again in 854, the Vikings overwintered in Thanet and continued their raids in spring. Thanet's monasteries were subsequently used by the Danes as feasting halls or general headquarters.
In 865, the Great Heathen Army encamped in Thanet and was promised by the people of Kent danegeld in exchange for peace. Regardless, the Vikings did not abide by this agreement and proceeded to rampage across eastern Kent.

By 1334–1335 Thanet had the highest population density in Kent according to King Edward III's lay subsidy rolls.  Margate is mentioned in 1349, in a dispute about the land of Westgate Manor. Thanet acted as a granary for Calais and documents towards the end of that century refer to turreted walls beneath the cliffs needing maintenance. Coastal erosion has long since destroyed these structures.

Governance
Margate was incorporated as a municipal borough in 1857 and Ramsgate in 1884. Broadstairs and St Peter's Urban District and the Isle of Thanet Rural District covered the rest of the island from 1894 until 1974. By 1974, however, all these boroughs and districts had been abolished, and since that year the Isle of Thanet has formed the major part of the District of Thanet.

Geology
The Isle is formed almost wholly of chalk, a soft pure white limestone of Cretaceous age, specifically the Margate Chalk Member (Santonian to Campanian) traditionally referred to simply as the 'Margate Chalk', and sometimes as the ‘Margate Member’. It is a sub-division of the Newhaven Chalk Formation. Beneath this and outcropping around the margins of the Isle is the Seaford Chalk Formation which contains relatively more flint nodules and seams. It has also been referred to as the ‘Broadstairs Member’. The Seaford Chalk is of Coniacian to Santonian age whilst the Margate Chalk is of Santonian to Campanian age. Both were traditionally referred to the ‘Upper Chalk’ but are now classed as parts of the ‘White Chalk Subgroup’ as part of the broader Chalk Group.

Overlying the chalk both within the Wantsum Channel and in patches on the surface of the Isle itself are the 100 m thick sands, silts and clays of the Palaeogene age Thanet Formation (formerly the Thanet Beds). The area gives its name to the internationally recognised Thanetian, descriptive of rocks of this particular part of the Palaeocene throughout the world. Brickearth head deposits lie within many of the shallow chalk valleys and across some areas of flatter ground within the Isle.

Geography
The Isle of Thanet first came into being when sea levels rose after the last glacial period, around 5000 BC. The North Sea encroached on the land which is now the estuary of the River Thames, and southwards to reach the higher land of the North Downs, leaving behind an island composed of chalk in its wake. Eventually the sea broke through river valleys in the North Downs to the south (Middle Chalk) and finally today's English Channel was opened up.  The proto-River Stour then formed part of the intervening water, with a new tributary, the River Wantsum, completing it; it became known as the Wantsum Channel.

The Wantsum Channel gradually narrowed as pebble beaches built up at the southern end of the strait, blocking silt coming down the Stour. Bede, in the 8th century, said that the Channel was then three furlongs wide. A map of 1414 showed a ferry crossing at Sarre. The first bridge over the channel was built there in 1485. Until the mid 18th century there was a ferry between Sandwich and the island; in 1755 a wooden drawbridge was built, and the ferry was closed.

Today the Isle is an island no longer and the erstwhile channel is now flat marshland criss-crossed by drainage ditches. Meanwhile, the exposed chalk cliffs are gradually being worn down by the sea, particularly at the North Foreland. Much else of the coast is a built-up area.  The Wantsum area is still liable to flooding: during the North Sea flood of 1953 Thanet was cut off for a few days, but the sea defences have been strengthened since then.

The soil and equable climate of the Isle have always encouraged arable farming.

Today there are still farms inland, but the coast is nearly all covered in settlements, most of which have come into being in the 19th and 20th centuries.

As the popularity of the seaside resort grew, so did that of the Isle of Thanet. At first the holidaymakers came by boat from London; after the coming of the railways in the mid-1840s, that became the preferred mode of transport. The population grew, as the following population statistics show:

Landmarks
The principal landmarks on the Isle are the North Foreland, and all the bays around the coastline, the principal ones of which are Minnis Bay, Palm Bay, Botany Bay, Joss Bay, and Pegwell Bay: the latter being part of the estuary of the River Stour. In 2007, seven of those beaches met stringent quality standards and were awarded as Blue Flag beaches: Minnis Bay, Botany Bay (Broadstairs), Margate Main Sands, St Mildreds Bay (Westgate), Stone Bay (Broadstairs), West Bay (Westgate), and Westbrook Bay. In 2008, this had risen to 10 beaches.

Transport
The rail connections are via the Chatham Main Line through Margate to Ramsgate, and the Ashford to Ramsgate (via Canterbury West) Line. A high-speed rail link from London to Thanet began in December 2009, and forms part of the UK's first true high-speed commuter service, according to the South Eastern Railway Company. The Thanet Loop bus service connects Margate, Ramsgate, and Broadstairs. Main road links are the A28, which brings traffic from Canterbury and Ashford; and the A299, north coast route. The Thanet Coastal Path skirts the coast.

There is an airport at Manston, formerly RAF Manston, but since renamed by its commercial operators as Manston Airport. The airport is no longer in operation.

Ferry services (predominantly freight and car with passengers) were operated by Transeuropa Ferries to Continental Europe from the Port of Ramsgate but ceased in 2013.

A tramway was once operated by the Isle of Thanet Electric Tramways and Lighting Company from Westbrook to Ramsgate from 1901 to 1937.

Cultural references 
 
 The Isle of Thanet is mentioned in the 1977 Ian Dury song "Billericay Dickie": "I'd rendezvous with Janet, quite near the Isle of Thanet, she looked more like a gannet, she wasn't half a prannet".
 It is also mentioned in the 2002 song "She's in Broadstairs" by Half Man Half Biscuit on their album Cammell Laird Social Club: "I'm on another planet, She's on the Isle of Thanet".
 The 2021 novel Dreamland by Rosa Rankin-Gee is set on the Isle of Thanet for most of its story.

Notes

References

Bibliography

 
 
 
 
 

Thanet
Thanet
History of Kent
Ancient Greek geography of Britain